Armored Core 2 is a 2000 third-person shooter mecha video game developed by FromSoftware for the PlayStation 2. It is the fourth entry in the Armored Core series and an indirect sequel to Armored Core: Master of Arena. In North America, Armored Core 2 was a launch title for the PlayStation 2. A direct sequel, Armored Core 2: Another Age, was released in 2001 for the PlayStation 2.

The story takes place almost 70 years after Master of Arena. Following the colonization of Mars, a powerful organization called the Frighteners overthrows the government at the behest of their leader, the enigmatic Leos Klein. The player is a mercenary who is tasked with dismantling the Frighteners and defeating Klein.

Armored Core 2's gameplay is largely similar to that of its predecessors. Players take control of powerful machines called Armored Cores and engage in dangerous missions or fight in the Arena against other pilots. Like earlier games, Armored Core 2 features a local multiplayer mode that includes a console linking feature and allows two players to fight each other with their own custom Armored Core.

Gameplay 

Armored Core 2 is a third-person shooter in which players pilot machines called Armored Cores. These Cores can be fully customized with different parts, weapons, and paint schemes to create a unique loadout. Players must balance their loadout to ensure that they aren't too heavy or are using too much power. In order to purchase more parts, players must earn credits through missions or the Arena.

Missions are largely unchanged from the original Armored Core. Players are given an objective to complete in open levels and can complete the objective however they choose. Enemies can consist of automated machines called MTs, mysterious unmanned weapons called Disorders, or other Armored Core pilots. Upon completion, repair and ammunition costs are deducted from the reward payout. If a player fails a mission, those costs are directly deducted from their overall balance.

The Arena is a largely freeform gamemode that the player can enter at any time. At the start of the game, the player is ranked at the bottom of a 50-person ladder and must fight their way to the top. Some ranked pilots can be killed over the course of the story missions and removed from the ladder. As players win, they can earn credits or parts for their victories that can be used in both the Arena and story missions.

In addition to missions and the Arena, a local multiplayer mode allows players to fight their friends via split screen or console linking with a Sony I-link Fire Wire cable. While split screen only requires one copy of the game, console linking requires two copies, along with two separate consoles and two televisions. Console linking allows for a larger number of location options in the game mode. Players with existing saves can load their custom Armored Core into these multiplayer matches.

Plot
67 years after Master of Arena, Earth's second largest corporation, Zio Matrix, acquires plans for a research project on Mars, dating back before the Great Destruction. Using these plans, Zio Matrix sends a research team to Mars to begin the Terraforming Project, which causes the Martian surface and atmosphere to approximate that of Earth. Other corporations learn of the project and quickly follow Zio Matrix, bringing with them the competitive environment that existed on Earth, and the employ of the mercenaries of Nerves Concord.

As the three companies' war comes to a close, Zio Matrix attempts a coup against the government, which has regained control through its elite mercenary team, The Frighteners, led by Leos Klein. But in the chaos that ensues, the Frighteners turn on the government, assassinate its leader, and take control of powerful technology. The player character is tasked with confronting them and saving the human populace of Mars.

Release 
Armored Core 2 was initially released in Japan for the Sony PlayStation 2 on August 3, 2000. FromSoftware partnered with Agetec and released a North American version on October 26 the same year as a launch title for the PlayStation 2. A European version was released in partnership with Ubisoft on March 23, 2001.

Reception

The game received "generally favorable reviews" according to the review aggregation website Metacritic. NextGens Chet Barber wrote that the game was "Definitely one of the best titles currently available for PS2. Certainly worth owning, unless you're turned off by the complex mech-building system or you hate mechs entirely." In Japan, Famitsu gave it a score of 33 out of 40.

Reviewers praised the graphical quality of Armored Core 2. Game Informers Andrew Reiner called the lighting effects and environments "absolutely incredible." GamePros Cheat Monkey wrote that "the graphics bring the AC world to life." GameRevolutions Shawn Sanders found the "particle effects [to be] impressive". AllGames Jon Thompson, on the other hand, didn't find the graphics to be as groundbreaking as his peers, writing that "it still looks acceptable."

Gameplay had mixed responses. GameSpots Frank Provo called it the game's "true beauty." IGNs David Smith wrote that the "progression curve occasionally leaps in bizarre directions at times." PlanetPS2s Jessyel Gonzalez agreed with Smith's complaints, noting that the game "demand[s] every single bit of patience in your mind to master the game."

Criticism was directed at the control scheme, with Smith noting that the game "has dragged its old control scheme into the new generation with it, and we gamers are much poorer for it." Thompson added: "The mechs are not as responsive as they should be, the targeting is oversensitive, and on the whole, the process of combat sometimes becomes more of a hassle than a good time."

Notes

References

External links

  
 Armored Core 2 at FromSoftware
 

2000 video games
Agetec games
Armored Core
Crave Entertainment games
Multiplayer and single-player video games
PlayStation 2 games
PlayStation 2-only games
Third-person shooters
Ubisoft games
Video games about mecha
Video games developed in Japan
Video games scored by Keiichiro Segawa
Video games scored by Kota Hoshino